The stippled studfish (Fundulus bifax) is a small freshwater fish which is endemic to the Tallapoosa River system in Georgia and Alabama, USA; and Sofkahatchee Creek (lower Coosa River system) in Alabama.  It belongs to the genus Fundulus in the killifish and topminnow family, Fundulidae.   It has been evaluated by the International Union for Conservation of Nature as "near threatened" and has not been recorded in Georgia since 1990.

References

Cashner, R.C., J.S. Rogers and J.M. Grady 1988 Fundulus bifax, a new species of the subgenus Xenisma from the Tallapoosa and Coosa river systems of Alabama and Georgia. Copeia (3):674-683.  .

External links
 Catalogue of Life 
 UNEP-WCMC Species Database

Stippled studfish
Studfish, Stippled
Studfish, Stippled
Studfish, Stippled
Fish described in 1988
Taxa named by Robert Cashner
Taxa named by James S. Rogers